Magdalina Valchanova (Магдалина Вълчанова) is a Bulgarian model, Miss Universe Bulgaria 2000, and a representative of the Bulgarian football team. She was born in 1977 in Plovdiv. In 2003, she posed for Playboy magazine.

Valchanova currently serves as the chairwoman of Face to Face Bulgaria, a non-governmental organization that prevents sex slavery in Bulgaria.

External links
 www.magdalina.com

1977 births
Anti–human trafficking activists
Bulgarian beauty pageant winners
Bulgarian female models
Living people
Miss Universe 2000 contestants